Hise Austin (September 8, 1950 - June 4, 2019) was a defensive back and wide receiver in the National Football League.

Biography
Austin was born on September 8, 1950, in Houston, Texas.

Career
Austin played at college level at Prairie View A&M University. He was drafted by the Green Bay Packers in the eighth round of the 1973 NFL Draft and played that season with the team. He played with the Portland Storm during the 1974 WFL season and the Kansas City Chiefs during the 1975 NFL season.

He was the lead pastor for The White Stone Church in The Woodlands, Texas. Austin was inducted into the Prairie View A&M University Sports Hall of Fame in 1998 for his efforts in football and track.

He died on June 4, 2019.

See also
List of Green Bay Packers players

References

Green Bay Packers players
Portland Storm players
Kansas City Chiefs players
Players of American football from Houston
American football defensive backs
American football wide receivers
Prairie View A&M Panthers football players
1950 births
Living people